Tikanoba (also, Tikanlıoba, Tikyanlioba, and Tikyanlyoba) is a village and municipality in the Khachmaz Rayon of Azerbaijan.  It has a population of 371.

References 

Populated places in Khachmaz District